Carlos Ledesma (born 18 January 1964) is a retired Argentina footballer spent part of the 1998 season with Major League Soccer club MetroStars, on loan from the Long Island Rough Riders.

External links
Player profile at MetroFanatic.com

1964 births
Living people
Argentine footballers
Brooklyn Knights players
Long Island Rough Riders players
New York Red Bulls players
A-League (1995–2004) players
Major League Soccer players
USL League Two players
USISL Select League players
Association football midfielders